South Garryowen is an unincorporated community in Butler Township, Jackson County, Iowa, United States, generally surrounding Saint Aloysius Church.

See also
Garryowen, Iowa

References

Unincorporated communities in Iowa
Unincorporated communities in Jackson County, Iowa
Irish-American neighborhoods